Hylis is a genus of beetles belonging to the family Eucnemidae.

The species of this genus are found in Europe and Northern America.

Species:
 Hylis cariniceps (Reitter, 1902)
 Hylis foveicollis (Thomson, 1874)

References

Elateroidea
Elateroidea genera